Polina, also known as Polina Gudieva or Contessa, is an American-based, Russian-born singer-songwriter. She co-wrote and is featured on "Book of Love". Her single with Felix Jaehn held the number one position on the German Airplay chart for four weeks.

Early years
Born in Moscow, Polina was musically inclined from an early age. The daughter of the Russian pop singer Anka, she grew up in a world of singing and performing. She played the classical piano, and soon she began writing, producing, and singing her own songs. During the electronic music boom in Europe in the 1990s, Polina found her true calling and has since combined her pop sensibilities with her passion for electronic and dance music.

Career
Early in her career, she moved to New York City where she met Sandy Vee and production team Stargate. Together, they co-wrote platinum recording artist Sean Kingston's 2011 single "Party All Night (Sleep All Day)," which peaked at number seven on the UK Pop Singles chart and number one on the UK R&B Singles chart. The song was featured on the soundtrack of "The Inbetweeners Movie," one of the most successful comedy films in British cinema history. After signing a publishing deal with Ultra, she has gone on to work with some of the biggest names in electronic dance music, including Steve Aoki, Tiësto, Kaskade, Laidback Luke, Moguai, and Todd Terry. Together with Digital Farm Animals co-wrote single "Faded" for Kain Rivers.

Achievements
Polina is known for vocalizing some of the biggest club records of the past few years, including Felix Cartal’s "Don't Turn On the Lights" (nominated for the Best Dance Recording at the 2013 JUNO Awards), as well as "Come With Me", her collaboration with Steve Aoki which was the single from his Grammy nominated album Wonderland. After appearing in the video for "Come With Me", Polina was handpicked by Dim Mak label boss Steve Aoki to join him on his Deadmeat tour in 2012 and appeared at some of dance music's biggest festivals, including Tomorrowland, Ultra Music Festival, and Electric Zoo,  garnering her features in Rolling Stone and Billboard magazines.

Solo career
Following her success with collaborations, she has had solo success with "Fade to Love," which held top positions in the European pop/dance charts throughout the year (including UK Top 20 Club chart), and the video, which reached number 3 on MTV Russia and number 6 on the Italian charts. In early 2015 Polina released a follow-up single called "Breathe." Most recently, she appeared, along with Rihanna, Skylar Grey, and Kendrick Lamar, as a featured artist on Eminem’s 16-track comeback Grammy award-winning album The Marshall Mathers LP 2, with her vocals on the track "Legacy".

References

External links
 

Living people
Date of birth missing (living people)
Russian expatriates in the United States
American singer-songwriters
Year of birth missing (living people)